Macosquin is a small village, townland, and civil parish in County Londonderry, Northern Ireland. In the 2011 Census it had a population of 614 people. The area is known for its caves and springs. It is situated within Causeway Coast and Glens district.

History 
Following fast growth in the 1950s and 1960s the village had a peak population of over 800 in the 1970s, but this has shrunk to a 2011 population of 614.

Churches
Nearest Religious buildings in Macosquin Village/Macosquin District:
St. Mary's Church of Ireland Parish Church
Macosquin Presbyterian Church
Coleraine Gospel Hall

2001 Census 
Macosquin is classified as a small village or hamlet by the NI Statistics and Research Agency (NISRA) (i.e. with population between 500 and 1,000 people). On Census day 2011 there were 614 people living in Macosquin. Of these:
36.97% were aged under 16 years and 18.89% were aged 60 and over
48.53% of the population were male and 51.46% were female
3.09% were from a Catholic background, 82.57% were from a Protestant background, and 9.6% considered themselves as having ‘no religion’
2.93% of people aged 16–74 were unemployed

For more details see: NI Neighbourhood Information

See also
List of civil parishes of County Londonderry

References

External links
BBC - Plantation of Ulster - Macosquin
Culture Northern Ireland
Macosquin Primary School

Villages in County Londonderry
Townlands of County Londonderry
Civil parishes of County Londonderry
Causeway Coast and Glens district